A consort of the Netherlands is a person married to a Dutch monarch during his or her reign. All female spouses of the monarchs of the Netherlands have been titled "Queen of the Netherlands" with the style Majesty. The male spouses of the three Queens regnant of the Netherlands were titled "Prince of the Netherlands" with the style Royal Highness. The spouse of the Bonaparte King of Holland was "Queen of Holland" with the style Majesty. The following spouses of the monarchs of Holland between 1806 and 1810; and the Netherlands since 1813:

Queen consorts of Holland

Royal consorts of Netherlands

See also
Princess of Orange
List of consorts of Luxembourg
Duchess of Limburg
List of Belgian consorts
Duchess of Brabant
Countess of Flanders
Countess of Hainaut
Countess of Holland
Countess of Artois
List of Burgundian consorts
List of consorts of Lorraine
Countess of Zutphen
List of monarchs of the Netherlands

Notes

 
Dutch
Dutch